The 2018–19 Luxembourg National Division was the 105th season of top-flight association football in Luxembourg. The season began on 5 August 2018 and ended on 19 May 2019.

F91 Dudelange were the defending champions from the previous season.

Teams
Rodange 91 and Esch were relegated at the end of the previous season. Etzella Ettelbruck and Rumelange joined the league this season after earning promotion from the Luxembourg Division of Honour.

Stadia and locations

Source: Scoresway

League table

Positions by round
The table lists the positions of teams after each week of matches. In order to preserve chronological evolvements, any postponed matches are not included to the round at which they were originally scheduled, but added to the full round they were played immediately afterwards.

Results
Each team played every other team in the league home-and-away for a total of 26 matches each.

Relegation play-offs
A play-off was played between the twelfth-placed team in the 2018–19 Luxembourg National Division and the third-placed team in the 2018–19 Luxembourg Division of Honour for one place in the 2019–20 Luxembourg National Division.

US Hostert remained in 2019–20 Luxenbourg National Division and FC Swift Hesperange remained in 2019–20 Luxenbourg Division d'Honneur

Top goalscorers

See also
2018–19 Luxembourg Cup
2018–19 Luxembourg Division of Honour

References

External links

Luxembourg National Division seasons
Luxembourg
1